The following is a list of presently operating intercity bus stops in Iowa with regular service. The list excludes charter buses, local transit buses, paratransit systems, and trolleybus systems. The following companies provide intercity bus service in Iowa as of September 2022:

 Burlington Trailways
 Greyhound Lines
 Jefferson Lines
 Lamers Bus Lines
 Tornado Bus Company

Stops
This is the list of 33 active intercity bus stops serving 29 cities in Iowa. This list does not include stops that are served only by commuter buses and not intercity buses. This list also does not include Tornado Bus Company stops, due to the difficulty of acquiring information on routes and stop locations.

Notes

The following intercity bus stops in Illinois and Nebraska connect with local transit systems which operate in Iowa.

Former

See also 
 List of Amtrak stations
 List of intercity bus stops in Illinois
 List of intercity bus stops in Wisconsin

References

External links
 IowaDOT 2021 Intercity Bus Map (Inaccurate)

Bus transportation in Iowa
Bus stations in Iowa
Transportation in Iowa